Antonin Igau (born 9 September 2000) is a French field hockey player who plays as a forward for Belgian Hockey League club Herakles and the French national team..

Club career
Igau started playing hockey when he was eight years old at Magdunois Hockey Club, he played there for seven seasons until 2015. He then played one year for Mer Hockey Club. From 2016 until 2018 he played for Stade Français and afterwards three years for Montrouge. After the 2021 European Championship he moved abroad to Royal Antwerp in the Belgian Hockey League. At the end of the season Antwerp was relegated to the second division but he kept playing in the first division because on 30 March 2022 it was announced he joined Herakles for the 2022–23 season.

International career

Junior national team
Antonin Igau made his debut for the French U–21 team in 2019. He represented the side at the EuroHockey Junior Championship in Valencia. He appeared in the team again in 2021, at the FIH Junior World Cup in Bhubaneswar. At the tournament he won a bronze medal.

Les Bleus
Two years after his junior debut, Igau made his first appearance for Les Bleus in a test match against Belgium in Antwerp.  Later that year he went on to represent the team at the EuroHockey Championships in Amsterdam. At the tournament, Igau was awarded the 'Volvo U–21 Talent of the Tournament'. Igau was named in the French squad for the 2021–22 FIH Pro League.

References

External links

2000 births
Living people
French male field hockey players
Male field hockey forwards
Men's Belgian Hockey League players
Place of birth missing (living people)
21st-century French people